Turkey is divided into 81 provinces. Each province is divided into a number of districts. Each provincial government is seated in the central district. For non-metropolitan municipality designated provinces, the central district bears the name of the province (e.g. the city/district of Rize is the central district of Rize Province). 

Each province is administered by an appointed governor from the Ministry of the Interior.

List of provinces 
Below is a list of the 81 provinces of Turkey, sorted according to their license plate codes. Initially, the order of the codes matched the alphabetical order of the province names. After Zonguldak (code 67), the ordering is not alphabetical, but in the order of the creation of provinces, as these provinces were created more recently and thus their plate numbers were assigned after the initial set of codes had been assigned.

Codes 
The province's ISO code suffix number, the first two digits of the vehicle registration plates of Turkey, and the first digits of the postal codes in Turkey are the same. The Nomenclature of Territorial Units for Statistics (NUTS) codes are different.

Defunct provinces 

 Çatalca, now part of Istanbul Province
 Gelibolu, now part of Çanakkale Province
 İçel (Silifke), now part of Mersin Province
 Kozan, now part of Adana Province
 Şebinkarahisar, now part of Giresun Province
 Elazığ Madeni, now part of Elazığ Province
 Genç, now part of Bingöl Province
 Doğubeyazıt, now part of Ağrı Province
 Siverek, now part of Şanlıurfa Province

See also 
 Regions of Turkey
 Districts of Turkey
 Villages of Turkey
 Metropolitan centers in Turkey

References

 
Subdivisions of Turkey
Provinces
Turkey 1
Turkey 1
Provinces, Turkey